Jamalpur-2 is a constituency represented in the Jatiya Sangsad (National Parliament) of Bangladesh since 2008 by M. Faridul Haq Khan of the Awami League.

Boundaries 
The constituency encompasses Islampur Upazila.

History 
The constituency was created in 1978 from the Mymensingh-2 constituency when the former Mymensingh District was split into two districts: Jamalpur and Mymensingh.

Ahead of the 2008 general election, the Election Commission redrew constituency boundaries to reflect population changes revealed by the 2001 Bangladesh census. The 2008 redistricting altered the boundaries of the constituency.

Ahead of the 2014 general election, the Election Commission reduced the boundaries of the constituency. Previously it had included two union parishads of Melandaha Upazila: Mahmudpur and Shaympur.

Members of Parliament

Elections

Elections in the 2010s

Elections in the 2000s

Elections in the 1990s

References

External links
 

Parliamentary constituencies in Bangladesh
Jamalpur District